The 2nd constituency of Deux-Sèvres is a French legislative constituency in the Deux-Sèvres département.

Deputies

Election results

2022

 
 
 
 
 

 
 
 
 

* PS dissident, not supported by NUPES.

2017

 
 
 
 
 
 
|-
| colspan="8" bgcolor="#E9E9E9"|
|-

2012

 
 
 
 
 
 
|-
| colspan="8" bgcolor="#E9E9E9"|
|-

2007

 
 
 
 
 
 
 
|-
| colspan="8" bgcolor="#E9E9E9"|
|-

2002

 
 
 
 
 
 
|-
| colspan="8" bgcolor="#E9E9E9"|
|-

1997

References

Sources

2